Young Guns may refer to:

Film and television
Young Guns (film), a 1988 action/western film
Young Guns II, the 1990 sequel to the 1988 film
Young Guns of Texas, a 1962 western film
The Young Guns (film), a 1956 western film directed by Albert Band

Music
Young Guns (band), a British alternative rock band
"Young Guns (Go for It)", a 1982 song by Wham!
"Young Guns" (Lewi White song), a 2011 song by Lewi White featuring Ed Sheeran, Yasmin, Griminal and Devlin
Young Guns, a 2014 live album by Pat Martino recorded in 1968-69

Sports
North Queensland Young Guns, an earlier Australian rugby league team competing in the Queensland Cup
Strikeforce: Young Guns, a series of mixed martial arts events held in 2007 and 2008
SSW Young Guns Championship, a secondary professional wrestling championship in Southern States Wrestling

Other uses
YoungGuns International Award, an annual global award show